Zarudny's jird (Meriones zarudnyi)  is a species of rodent in the family Muridae. It is found in Afghanistan, Iran, and Turkmenistan.

References

Meriones (rodent)
Jird, Zarudny's
Mammals of Afghanistan
Mammals described in 1937
Taxonomy articles created by Polbot